7-Hydroxyamoxapine is an active metabolite of the antidepressant drug amoxapine (Asendin). It contributes to amoxapine's pharmacology. It is a dopamine receptor antagonist and contributes to amoxapine's antipsychotic properties.

See also 
 8-Hydroxyamoxapine

References 

Dibenzoxazepines
Piperazines
Tricyclic antidepressants
Chloroarenes
Hydroxyarenes
Human drug metabolites